Abigail Eaton (born 2 January 1992) is a British racing driver from the East Riding of Yorkshire, England. She starred as the test driver for the second and third series of The Grand Tour, an Amazon Prime Video-exclusive motoring series.

Eaton is a qualified racing instructor and a performance driving coach. In October 2021, Eaton broke her back in an accident during a W Series race at the Circuit of the Americas, requiring rehabilitation and a break from racing.

Racing career

Karting
Eaton began kart racing at the age of ten in the Comer cadet class, gaining invaluable track craft along with numerous podiums and wins. She then resumed kart racing for three more years, moving up into Minimax and then Junior Max, competing in the  series.

SAXMAX
Eaton completed her first season racing cars in 2007, in the SAXMAX Championship at various tracks around the United Kingdom with a highest position of fourth place. In 2008, Eaton returned to the SAXMAX championship and led for most of the year but ended in fourth place, with three podiums and two fastest laps.

Production Touring Car Trophy & British GT
In 2009, Eaton moved into her first year of adult car racing in the Production Touring Car Championship, driving a Vauxhall Corsa SRi-R. She won the class B championship outright with 9/18 wins, sixteen podium positions, and seven fastest laps, finishing second overall in the championship.

In 2010, Eaton was without a team when her British GT debut fell through a few weeks before the season was due to start. However, she did manage to make one race in the Mazda MX-5 Mk1 championship, finishing third out of over 90 entries.

Mazda MX-5 Cup
In 2011, Eaton raced a rear wheel drive Mazda MX-5 Cup car. After a tough season where she missed several rounds due to a lack of budget, Eaton managed to achieve eleven top-ten finishes and a third place qualifying position.

Eaton competed in a handful of races in the 2012 Mazda MX-5 Cup, but had to withdraw owing to family circumstances.

Mazda MX-5 Supercup

In 2013, Eaton raced in the last three races of the Mazda MX-5 SuperCup with a win, two second places, one third and one fourth. She also raced in the Autumn Challenge and achieved two second places.

In 2014, Eaton returned to the British Racing and Sports Car Club (BRSCC) Mazda MX-5 Supercup Championship for the last time.  Despite car troubles early in the season, Eaton went on to achieve five wins, seven podium finishes, six fastest laps, two pole positions, and a new lap record. She was crowned the 2014 Mazda MX-5 Supercup Champion. During a race at the Anglesey Circuit, she qualified on pole position eight-tenths of a second ahead of second placed position, and went on to win, set the fastest lap, and then set a new lap record, all within three races.

GT Cup
Eaton entered GT Racing via the UK based championship GT Cup. She competed for part of season in a BMW E46 M3 GTR run by Geoff Steel Racing. Eaton achieved one win, eight podium finishes, and three fastest laps.

British GT

In 2016, Eaton moved to the British GT Championship in a Maserati Granturismo MC GT4, the first time that Maserati had been in the British GT for over 20 years. She shared driving duties with Marcus Hoggarth, and their team placed second in the Pro/Am Championship and fourth overall.

Blancpain GT
In 2017, Eaton began with a year out, and was then offered a one off drive for the 2017 Blancpain GT Series in a Ferrari 488 GT3 run by AF Corse. This was Eaton's first time in a GT3 specification car and first time at the Autodromo Nazionale Monza circuit in Italy.  Following ten laps of practice, Eaton entered the race as one of the 52 cars starting, and finished in first position in the Am cup, making her the first female driver ever to win a class in the series.  The car was number 961, driven by Eaton, Alex Demirdjian, and Davide Rizzo.

Television career 
Eaton appeared on ITV's Drive in 2015, coaching rapper Professor Green in various racing car challenges over a five-week period. This included mud buggy, stock car, and sports car races. Eaton and Professor Green were the most successful pairing, staying out of the eliminator night race and making it through to the final round. Eaton and Professor Green were crowned champions in the last episode.

Eaton also stars as the test driver from the second series onwards of the British motoring show The Grand Tour, replacing the previous first series test driver Mike Skinner. James May stated in November 2017 that a large number of drivers had been tested, and that "she was the fastest and the best". Eaton was later introduced to the show in the second episode of the second series, on 15 December 2017, when she was shown testing a green Mercedes-AMG GT R around the Eboladrome test track. In the Mercedes, Eaton says "Right, here we go" to herself, before starting the lap and completing the test drive silently. Eaton did not have her name mentioned at all throughout the episode, only being referred to as "she", and her name was only shown in the credits at the end of the episode, credited as "driver".

Motor1.com speculated that The Grand Tour would likely be under legal restrictions, and needing to provide differentiation between The Grand Tour test driver and anonymous drivers such as the Stig. A spokesperson for Amazon suggested to Jalopnik of a compromise between the explicitly named "the American" test driver portrayed by Skinner, and being unable to use a completely anonymous driver like on Top Gear. During the first episode of the third series, Jeremy Clarkson referred to her simply as, "Abbie", suggesting that Amazon may have finally made a decision in this matter. During the fifth episode of the third season, Clarkson presents her at the beginning of a race by noting that the car "is being driven by The Grand Tour's racing driver, Abbie Eaton."

In April 2018, Eaton was interviewed by Red Bull about her work on The Grand Tour.

Personal life
Eaton lives in Northampton, England, along with her pets.  Her father, Paul Eaton, is also a racing driver.

She came out as a lesbian at the age of 17, and is in a relationship with fellow British racecar driver Jessica Hawkins. She is a Driver Ambassador for Racing Pride, an LGBT rights charity working in the motorsport industry to promote inclusivity across the sport, and amongst its technological and commercial partners.

Racing record

Career summary

Complete Super2 Series results
(key) (Round results only)

Complete W Series results 
(key) (Races in bold indicate pole position) (Races in italics indicate fastest lap)

* Season still in progress.

References

Further reading

External links

 
 Abbie Eaton Supercars Official Profile
 Driver Database profile
 
 Abbie Eaton's channel on YouTube

1992 births
English racing drivers
English female racing drivers
LGBT racing drivers
Living people
Sportspeople from Kingston upon Hull
English LGBT people
Britcar drivers
21st-century LGBT people
W Series drivers
AF Corse drivers
British GT Championship drivers